The Colorado Rockies Radio Network consists of 34 stations (24 A.M., 10 F.M.) plus two F.M. boosters and 10 F.M. translators in six western states of the US. The English language announcers are Jack Corrigan, Jerry Schemmel and Mike Rice. In addition to in-game duties, Corrigan hosts Rockies Q&A and Rice hosts The Rockies Dugout Show.

Network stations (26 stations)

Flagship

Affiliates

Colorado

Kansas

Nebraska

Nevada

New Mexico

South Dakota

Utah

Wyoming

See also
List of XM Satellite Radio channels
List of Sirius Satellite Radio stations
List of Colorado Rockies broadcasters

References

External links
 Colorado Rockies radio affiliates from MLB

Colorado Rockies

Major League Baseball on the radio
Sports radio networks in the United States